This is a list of Punjabi films of 2019.

Box office

January - December

Events 
 PTC Punjabi Film Awards 2019 on 16 March 2019

References

2019
Films
Punjabi